Dusharla Satyanarayana (born 12 March 1954) is an Indian water rights activist and founder of Jala Sadhana Samithi (JSS). He is fighting for drinking and irrigation water for Nalgonda district in Telangana, formerly Andhra Pradesh, India, by completing decades old Srisailam Left Bank Canal Tunnel scheme. He also supported statehood for Telangana. He is also Vice President of Suvidha.

Early life
He was born in Raghavapuram village, Mothey Mandal, Nalgonda district, Telangana State. 
He did his B.Sc. (Agriculture) from Jayashanker Agricultural University, Hyderabad.

Career
He joined Andhra Bank! Cuddapah in 1977, worked as an Agricultural assistant. He reigned and worked as Rural Development Officer in Union Bank of India. After looking at the plight of the small and marginal farmers he quit his job and started his activist life.

Jala Sadhana Samithi
He founded Jala Sadhana Samithi in 1980 to fight for the unjust treatment of water allocation to Nalgonda, which resulted in widespread cases of fluorosis. He did walkathons for water as well as Telangana statehood.

He did various types of protests like padayatras from Nalgonda to Srisailam, Yadagirigutta and Hyderabad to highlight the water woes of the people of the region in general and the fluoride victims of the district in particular. He did protests in Delhi.

He created a forest in his own barren land of 70 Acres, in his village.

Personal life
He is married but lives separately.  His son is a Veterinary doctor.

References

Activists from Telangana
People from Nalgonda
1954 births
Living people